Senator Tolman may refer to:

James E. Tolman (1867–1956), Massachusetts State Senate
Steven Tolman (born 1954), Massachusetts State Senate
Warren Tolman (born 1959), Massachusetts State Senate